Davidioides martini, Syrandiri clubtail,  is a species of dragonfly in the family Gomphidae. It is known only from the Western Ghats of India.

Description and habitat
It is a medium sized dragonfly with thorax black on dorsum, and yellow on the sides. There is a slightly oblique ante-humeral
stripe and two narrow parallel black stripes on the sutures enclosing an equally narrow yellow line. Abdomen is black, marked with yellow. Segment 1 has a large spot on the dorsum and the sides. Segment 2 has a mid-dorsal spot. Segment 3 to 7 have basal rings, narrow on 3 to 6, occupying the basal half on segment 7. Segment 8 to 10 are unmarked. Anal appendages are yellow, black on the base. 

This species is found in banks of montane forest streams where it breeds.

See also
 List of odonates of India
 List of odonata of Kerala

References

Gomphidae
Taxa named by Frederic Charles Fraser